The 1874 Galway Borough by-election was held on 29 June 1874.  The byelection was held due to the void Election of the incumbent Home Rule MP, Frank Hugh O'Donnell, in the March By-election.  It was won by the Home Rule candidate Michael Francis Ward.

References

Politics of Galway (city)
1874 elections in the United Kingdom
By-elections to the Parliament of the United Kingdom in County Galway constituencies
1874 elections in Ireland